Jigme Ugyen Wangchuck (born 19 March 2020) is the second child of King Jigme Khesar Namgyel Wangchuck of Bhutan and his wife, Queen Jetsun Pema. He is the second line to the throne after his brother Crown Prince Jigme Namgyel Wangchuck. 
On 17 December 2019, it was reported that the king and queen were expecting their second child, to be born in spring 2020. On 19 March 2020, the king and queen's official Instagram accounts reported that she had given birth to her second son in Lingkana Palace in Thimphu. On 30 June 2020, the Royal Family announced that the second baby had been named Jigme Ugyen Wangchuck, and would be known as His Royal Highness Gyalsey Ugyen Wangchuck.

References

See also
 House of Wangchuck
 Line of succession to the Bhutanese throne

2020 births
Living people
People from Thimphu
Royal children
Bhutanese monarchy
Wangchuck dynasty
Sons of kings